Hieronymus Christoph Jan Eugen Franz Gottfried Maria Freiherr von Pölnitz, known as Götz Freiherr von Pölnitz (11 December 1906, Munich - 9 November 1967, Erlangen) was a German social historian, economic historian and archivist.

1906 births
1967 deaths
20th-century German historians